United Nations Security Council resolution 1328, adopted unanimously on 27 November 2000, after considering a report by the Secretary-General Kofi Annan regarding the United Nations Disengagement Observer Force (UNDOF) and reaffirming Resolution 1308 (2000), the Council extended its mandate for a further six months until 31 May 2001.

The resolution called upon the parties concerned to immediately implement Resolution 338 (1973) and requested that the Secretary-General submit a report on the situation at the end of that period.

The Secretary-General's report pursuant to the previous resolution on UNDOF said that the situation between Israel and Syria had remained calm with no serious incidents though the situation in the Middle East as a whole remained dangerous until a settlement could be reached. Restrictions on the freedom of movement of UNDOF remained and both countries denied the Force access to some of their positions.

See also
 Arab–Israeli conflict
 Golan Heights
 Israel–Syria relations
 List of United Nations Security Council Resolutions 1301 to 1400 (2000–2002)

References

External links
 
Text of the Resolution at undocs.org

 1328
 1328
 1328
2000 in Israel
2000 in Syria
November 2000 events